The Warm Air Research House is a historic house and research facility located at 1108 W. Stoughton St. in Urbana, Illinois. Built in 1924, the house served as a warm-air heating research facility administered jointly by the National Warm-Air Heating and Ventilating Association and the University of Illinois Department of Mechanical Engineering. Prior to the 1920s, the American heating industry had few formal testing procedures for their products, and home heating through warm-air ventilation ducts was still considered a novel concept. The National Warm-Air Heating and Ventilating Association began to test heating methods and systems in the Department of Mechanical Engineering's laboratories, but it eventually needed a model house in which to test its domestic heating systems. The two organizations commissioned the large Colonial Revival residence, which was designed by architect Loring Harvey Provine and graduate student Clarence Andrew Kissinger. Beginning in 1932, research on air conditioning and cooling systems was also conducted in the house. Following World War II, the facility became less useful due to the shrinking size of new American homes, and the university sold the house in 1946. Some of the technologies developed in the house include storm windows, forced-air heating, and heating duct size and positioning.

The house was added to the National Register of Historic Places on June 12, 2001.

References

Houses on the National Register of Historic Places in Illinois
Colonial Revival architecture in Illinois
Houses completed in 1924
Houses in Champaign County, Illinois
Buildings and structures in Urbana, Illinois
National Register of Historic Places in Champaign County, Illinois